Thor Jørgen Spurkeland (born 12 May 1987) is an inactive Norwegian footballer who played midfielder and striker.

Biography
Spurkeland grew up in Knarvik, Norway and played for NBK's youth team. In 2003, he was transferred to Brann and played his first game on 26 May 2004 against Norheimsund. Brann won the Norwegian Cup the following season and Spurkeland was given the Kniksen Award. He scored his first goal on 7 May 2005 in a Norwegian Cup game against Gneist. In 2006, he was loaned to Løv-Ham, then signed a two-year contract with Brann and was sent to play for Fyllingen Fotball In 2008, Spurkeland was selected to play for the Firdalaget team and was transferred to Førde, where he remained until 2017. Following a two-year break from football, Spurkeland signed with Askvoll Holmedal in 2019.

He has been teaching kindergarten in Sunnfjord since 2016.

References 

1987 births
Living people
Norwegian footballers
SK Brann players
Løv-Ham Fotball players
Fyllingen Fotball players
People from Hordaland
Footballers from Bergen

Association football midfielders